Charlie William Henry Savage (born 2 May 2003) is a Welsh professional footballer who plays as a midfielder for  club Forest Green Rovers, on loan from  side Manchester United. He has represented Wales at various youth international levels and is the son of former Welsh international Robbie Savage.

Early life
Savage was born in Leicester, Leicestershire, and was educated at Manchester Grammar School. He followed in the footsteps of his father, former Welsh international footballer Robbie Savage, by joining the youth ranks of Manchester United.

Club career
Savage signed his first professional contract with Manchester United in April 2021. He made his first-team debut for United on 8 December 2021, replacing Juan Mata in the 89th minute of the 2021–22 UEFA Champions League match against Young Boys, while his father, Robbie Savage, was co-commentating on the match for BT Sport. On 22 May 2022, Savage was named in a Premier League matchday squad for the first time, against Crystal Palace.

In January 2023, Savage joined Forest Green Rovers for the remainder of the 2022–23 season.

International career
Savage has represented Wales at under-17, under-18, under-19 and under-21 levels. He was called up to the under-19 team for a friendly tournament in Croatia in September 2021, and scored in a 3–2 defeat to Austria. In September 2022, Savage was called up to the Wales under-21 squad for the first time.

Style of play
A central midfielder like his father, Savage is comfortable both defending and going forward. Despite the similarities, Savage has said that he does not see the likeness, stating that he is more of a technical, ball playing midfielder, rather than a tenacious player like his father was.

Career statistics

References

External links

Profile at ManUtd.com

2003 births
Living people
Footballers from Leicester
Welsh footballers
Association football midfielders
Manchester United F.C. players
Forest Green Rovers F.C. players
English Football League players
Wales youth international footballers
Wales under-21 international footballers
English people of Welsh descent
People educated at Manchester Grammar School